Oliver Lee may refer to:

Oliver Lee (New Mexico gunfighter) (1865–1941), American political figure
Oliver M. Lee (born 1929), Chinese-American academic; campaigned for U.S. Senate (See Electoral history of Daniel Inouye)
Oliver Lee (actor) (born 1985), English performer
Olly Lee (born 1991), English midfielder for Gillingham
Oliver Lee, one half of British electronic music duo Snakehips
Oliver Lee (naval architect), boat designer and builder, whose designs include the Ajax 23 and Squib sailboat
Oliver A. Lee, former senior officer in the UK Royal Marines
Oliver J. Lee (1876-1947), American farmer, businessman, and politician

See also
USS Oliver H. Lee (1861), American schooner used by Union Navy during Civil War
Oliver Lee Memorial State Park, American state park, located in Southern New Mexico's Otero County, United States
Lee (English surname)